Argeliers is a commune in the Aude department in the Occitanie region of southern France.

The inhabitants of the commune are known as Argeliésois or Argeliésoises

Geography
Argeliers is part of the urban area of Narbonne located on the southern edge of the Haut-Minervois and in the north of the fertile sedimentary plain of Narbonne, 22 km west by south-west of Béziers and 16 km north-west of Narbonne at the foot of the first foothills north of the plain of Narbonne. The northern border of the commune is the border between Aude and Hérault departments. Access to the commune is by the D5 road from Capestang in the east passing through the commune south of the village and continuing to Pouzols-Minervois in the west. Access to the village is by the D326 from Mirepeisset in the south intersecting the D5 and continuing to the village then north-east. The D36E48 comes from Montouliers in the north changing to the D426 at the border and continuing to join the D5 south-west of the village. The D826 also connects the village to the D5. The village residential area covers about a quarter of the commune with forests along the western border and the rest of the commune is farmland.

The Canal du Midi forms part of the eastern border of the commune passing through the commune east of the village where there are mooring facilities known as Port d'Argeliers. Other streams passing through the commune near the Canal include the Ruisseau des Gours and the Ruisseau de Roze.

Climate

Neighbouring communes and villages

History

The Argeliers committee

On 11 March 1907 a signal for revolt was given by a group of Minervois winemakers in the village of Argeliers. They were led by Marcelin Albert and Élie Bernard who founded the Committee for the Defence of Wine-making or the Argeliers Committee. He organized a march with 87 winemakers to Narbonne for an interview with a parliamentary commission. After his depositions the defence committee went around the town singing for the first time La Vigneronne which from that day became the anthem of the Beggars' revolt.

Élie Bernard was later appointed Secretary-General of the Confédération générale des vignerons du Midi (General Confederation of winemakers of Midi). It was the Argeliers committee, which included all the producers, who prepared a response to the crisis. On 14 March Albert Sarraut from Bordeaux, Senator for Aude and Under Secretary of State for the Interior, was admonished by Clemenceau for trying to plead for his electorate: "I know the Midi, it will all end with a banquet" he said to Clemenceau who was then President of the Council which sat at Beauveau in the Ministry of Interior.

On 24 March a first meeting organized by the Argeliers Committee was held at Sallèles-d'Aude in front of 300 people. Marcelin Albert was noted for his oratory and charisma. For the winemakers present he became the apostle, the king of beggars, or the Redeemer. The principle of holding a meeting every Sunday in a different town was adopted.

On 21 April 10 to 15 thousand growers gathered at Capestang. On that Sunday the first issue of Tocsin was published by the Argeliers Committee. This was a weekly paper directed by Marcelin Albert with Louis Blanc writing. This issue contained an address to Parliament to have a law voted against fraud.

Heraldry

Administration

List of Successive Mayors

Demography
In 2017 the commune had 2,139 inhabitants.

Economy
Viticulture: Minervois (AOC) and Languedoc (AOC)

Sites and Monuments
The Chateau of Argeliers (17th century) is listed as an historical monument.
The Monumental Fountain of Vendangeur (19th century) in the Place du Vendangeur is registered as an historical object.
The Church and Cemetery contain several items that are registered as historical objects:
A Monument to Raffit (19th century)
A Monument to Cabannes Didier (1883)
A Painting: The Resurrection (18th century)
An Altar, Retable, and Painting: The Crucifixion (17th century)

Notable people linked to the commune
Marcelin Albert (1851-1921): leader of the winemakers of Midi revolt in 1907. He was born and died in the village and is buried in the cemetery there. A village square is named in his honour;
Élie Bernard (?-1935): another leader of the winemakers revolt in Languedoc in 1907 with Richard and Cathala: at the start in Argeliers, imprisoned in Béziers prison with Dr. Ernest Ferroul, deputy mayor of Narbonne with Richard and Cathala, appointed director of the union newspaper Winemakers Action, then Secretary General of the General Confederation of winemakers, died in 1935;
Étienne Bonnes (1894-?): International rugby player born in Argeliers;
Leon Còrdas (1913-1987): writer, ran a theatre troupe in Argeliers.
Max Roqueta a contemporary Occitan writer, was born in Argeliers in 1908.

See also
Communes of the Aude department

References

External links
Ode to Aude Tourism website
Winemakers Revolt in Argeliers 1907 
Argeliers on Géoportail, National Geographic Institute (IGN) website 
Argelliers on the 1750 Cassini Map

Communes of Aude